The 2013 Louisiana–Monroe Warhawks football team represented University of Louisiana at Monroe in the 2013 NCAA Division I FBS football season.  The team was led by fourth-year head coach Todd Berry.  The Warhawks played their home games at Malone Stadium and competed in the Sun Belt Conference. They finished the season 6–6, 4–3 in Sun Belt play to finish in a four-way tie for third place. Despite being bowl eligible, they were not selected to play in a bowl game.

Pre-season

Recruits

Award watch lists
 Kolton Browning – Maxwell Award Watch

Roster

Schedule

Source: Schedule

Game summaries

@ Oklahoma

In their first game of the season, the Warhawks lost, 34–0 to the Oklahoma Sooners.

Grambling State

In their second game of the season, the Warhawks won, 48–10 over the Grambling State Tigers.

@ Wake Forest

In their third game of the season, the Warhawks won, 21–19 over the Wake Forest Demon Deacons.

@ Baylor

In their fourth game of the season, the Warhawks lost, 70–7 to the Baylor Bears.

Tulane

In their fifth game of the season, the Warhawks lost, 31–14 to the Tulane Green Wave.

Starting Quarterback, Kolton Browning, was injured in this game and will be out for the season.

WKU

In their sixth game of the season, the Warhawks lost, 31–10 to the WKU Hilltopers.

Quarterback Blale Brown made his first start as a ULM Warhawks.

@ Texas State

In their seventh game of the season, the Warhawks won, 21–14 over the Texas State Bobcats.

Georgia State

In their eighth game of the season, the Warhawks won, 38–10 over the Georgia State Panthers.

@ Troy

In their ninth game of the season, the Warhawks won, 49–37 over the Troy Trojans.

Arkansas State

In their tenth game of the season, the Warhawks lost, 42–14 to the Arkansas State Red Wolves.

@ South Alabama

In their eleventh game of the season, the Warhawks lost, 36–14 to the South Alabama Jaguars.

@ Louisiana–Lafayette

In their twelfth game of the season, the Warhawks won, 31–28 over the Louisiana–Lafayette Ragin' Cajuns.

Statistics
''As of the end of the 2013 football season

Team

Score by quarters

Offense

Rushing

Passing

Receiving

Defense

Special teams

References

Louisiana-Monroe
Louisiana–Monroe Warhawks football seasons
Louisiana-Monroe Warhawks football